The Rotating disk viscometer, or "Mooney Machine" as it is sometimes referred to in the rubber industry, is the standard viscometer for measuring material viscosity and scorch time for rubber before vulcanization. It was developed in the 1930s by Melvin Mooney. For a specific temperature, scorch time describes how long it will take the material to vulcanize.  For example, a scorch time at ambient temperature indicates the rubber will be able to remain unvulcanized at room temperature for an extended period of time.

Overview
The Mooney machine itself consists of a cylindrical, serrated, metal disk designed to hold a material sample without slippage during rotation.  This disk is surrounded by a die chamber where the rubber is pressed with 2500 pounds of force.  The rubber is then warmed for two minutes.  Next, the serrated disk is rotated, in one direction only, at a speed of 2 revolutions per minute, while the torque required to rotate the disk is recorded.  The torque decrease per time can be directly related to viscosity.

As the material further warms during initial rotation of the serrated disk and the rubber begins to shear, the viscosity lowers and torque required decreases.  Eventually, the torque will reach an inflection point, where the rubber begins to vulcanize and torque begins increasing.  A shear pin on the machine prevents damage as the testing material stiffens.  Comparing the torque versus time curves for different materials allows direct correlation of material viscosity and scorch time.

References 

Measurement